Palaquium leiocarpum is a tree in the family Sapotaceae. The specific epithet leiocarpum means "smooth fruit".

Description
The bark is brownish to reddish grey. Inflorescences bear up to six flowers.

Distribution and habitat
Palaquium leiocarpum is native to Peninsular Malaysia, Borneo, Sulawesi and possibly Sumatra. Its habitat is mixed swamp forest, mixed dipterocarp forest and kerangas forest.

Conservation
Palaquium leiocarpum has been assessed as near threatened on the IUCN Red List. The species is threatened by logging and conversion of land for palm oil plantations.

References

leiocarpum
Trees of Peninsular Malaysia
Trees of Borneo
Trees of Sulawesi
Trees of Sumatra
Plants described in 1900